Bala Ali (16 August 1968 – ?) was a footballer who played as a winger for clubs in Nigeria and Greece.

Club career
In 1991, Ali joined Greek Superleague side Panachaiki F.C. for one season appearing in 16 league matches for the club.

International career
Ali made several appearances for the Nigeria national football team. He scored on his debut, a friendly against Upper Volta in 1981. He also played for Nigeria at the 1984 African Cup of Nations finals, helping the squad to a runners-up finish.

He played in a 1990 FIFA World Cup qualifying match against Angola. His teammate, Samuel Okwaraji died during the match.

References

External links
ΞΕΝΟΙ ΠΑΙΚΤΕΣ ΚΑΙ ΠΡΟΠΟΝΗΤΕΣ ΤΗΣ ΠΑΝΑΧΑΪΚΗΣ

1968 births
Nigerian footballers
Nigeria international footballers
1984 African Cup of Nations players
Panachaiki F.C. players
Year of death missing

Association football wingers